The 2012 IIHF InLine Hockey World Championship Division I was an international inline hockey tournament run by the International Ice Hockey Federation. The Division I tournament ran alongside the 2012 IIHF InLine Hockey World Championship and took place between 1 and 7 June 2012 in Ingolstadt, Germany. The tournament was won by Slovakia who upon winning gained promotion to the 2013 IIHF Inline Hockey World Championship. While Bulgaria and New Zealand were relegated after finishing last and second last respectively.

Qualification
Six teams attempted to qualify for the two remaining spots in the 2012 IIHF InLine Hockey World Championship Division I tournament. The other six nations automatically qualified after their results from the 2011 World Championship and the 2011 Division I tournaments. Two qualification tournaments were held with a place awarded to the winner of each tournament. The European Qualification tournament was contested between Bulgaria, Macedonia and Turkey, with Bulgaria winning both of their games and earning a qualification spot. The Rest of the World Qualification tournament was contested between Chinese Taipei, New Zealand and South Africa, with New Zealand winning promotion.

 − Finished fourth in 2011 World Championship Division I
 − Finished third in 2011 World Championship Division I
 − Winner of the European Qualification
 − Finished fifth in 2011 World Championship Division I
 − Finished second in 2011 World Championship Division I
 − Returned to competition after a year out due to force majeure
 − Winner of the Rest of the World Qualification
 − Relegated from the 2011 World Championship

European Qualification
The European Qualification tournament was held at the Winter Palace in Sofia, Bulgaria from 2 September 2011 to 4 September 2011. Bulgaria gained promotion to Division I after winning both of their games against Macedonia and Turkey. Turkey finished in second place after they won their other game against the Macedonian team.

All times are local.

Rest of the World Qualification
The Rest of the World Qualification tournament was held at the New Plymouth Rollersports Arena in New Plymouth, New Zealand from 18 November 2011 to 20 November 2011. New Zealand gained promotion to Division I after winning both of their games against Chinese Taipei and South Africa. Chinese Taipei finished in second place after they won their other game against the South African team.

All times are local.

Seeding and groups
The seeding in the preliminary round was based on the final standings at the 2011 IIHF InLine Hockey World Championship and 2011 IIHF InLine Hockey World Championship Division I. Division I's groups are named Group C and Group D while the 2012 IIHF InLine Hockey World Championship use Group A and Group B, as both tournaments are held in Ingolstadt, Germany. The teams were grouped accordingly by seeding at the previous year's tournament (in parenthesis is the corresponding seeding):

Group C
 (9)
 (12)
 (13)
 (16)

Group D
 (10)
 (11)
 (14)
 (15)

Preliminary round
Eight participating teams were placed in the following two groups. After playing a round-robin, every team advanced to the Playoff round.

All times are local (UTC+2).

Group C

Group D

Playoff round 
All eight teams advanced into the playoff round and were seeded into the quarterfinals according to their result in the preliminary round. The winning quarterfinalists advanced through to the semifinals, while the losing teams moved through to the placement round. Bulgaria and New Zealand were relegated after losing their placement round games, while Australia and Japan advanced to a 5/6 placement game with Australia defeating Japan 7–3. In the semifinals Hungary defeated Austria and Slovakia defeating Croatia, both advancing to the gold medal game. After losing the semifinals Austria and Croatia played off for the bronze medal with Austria winning in overtime. Slovakia defeated Hungary 5–4 in the gold medal game and earned promotion to the 2013 IIHF Inline Hockey World Championship.

Quarterfinals
All times are local (UTC+2).

{{Hockeybox
|bg         = #eeeeee
|date       = 5 June 2012
|time       = 13:00
|team1      = 
|team2      = |score      = 5 – 0
|progression = 
|periods    = (2–0, 1–0, 1–0, 1–0)
|goalie1    = 
|goalie2    = 
|goals1     = 
|goals2     = 
|stadium    = Saturn Rink 2
|attendance = 128
|official   = 
|official2  = 
|reference  = http://stats.iihf.com/hydra/inline/146/IHM146313_74_2_0.pdf
|penalties1 = 
|penalties2 = 
|shots1     = 
|shots2     = 
}}

Placement round

5/6 placement

Semifinals

Bronze medal game

Gold medal game

Ranking and statistics

Final standings
The final standings of the tournament according to IIHF:

Tournament AwardsBest players selected by the directorate:Best Goalkeeper:  Tamas KissBest Defenseman:  Gerd GruberBest Forward:'''  Roman Simunek

Scoring leaders
List shows the top skaters sorted by points, then goals. If the list exceeds 10 skaters because of a tie in points, all of the tied skaters are shown.

Leading goaltenders
Only the top five goaltenders, based on save percentage, who have played at least 40% of their team's minutes are included in this list.

See also
2012 IIHF InLine Hockey World Championship

References

External links

IIHF.com

IIHF InLine Hockey World Championship Division I
2012 in inline hockey
IIHF InLine Hockey World Championship
IIHF InLine Hockey World Championship Division I
Sports competitions in Ingolstadt
Inline hockey in Germany